The Champion Stakes is a horse race run at Ascot Racecourse in England.

Champion Stakes may also refer to:

Champion Stakes (United States), a horse race run at Long Branch racetrack from 1879 to 1892
Champion Stakes (greyhounds), a greyhound race run at Romford Stadium
Champion Stakes (Irish greyhounds), a greyhound race run at Shelbourne Park
Irish Champion Stakes, a horse race run at Leopardstown Racecourse
Champions Stakes (VRC), a horse race run at Flemington Racecourse, previously known as the LKS Mackinnon Stakes